Serbian Argentines or Serb Argentines refers to Argentine citizens of ethnic Serb descent or a Serbia-born person who resides in Argentina.

Although today Serbia and Montenegro are different countries, it is difficult to account separately the immigration flow from each of them, since the majority declares as Serbs. There are an estimated 30,000 people of Serbian and Montenegrin origin living in Argentina today. They mostly originate from the territories of today’s Montenegro and Croatia (Dalmatia), and, to a lesser extent, from Serbia and Bosnia and Herzegovina. Emigration in Argentina, despite the same origin as the one in North America, has developed distinguishing social and cultural character. They live in different regions of Argentina, but mostly in the provinces Chaco, Buenos Aires and Santa Fe.

The research (Ethnographic Institute of the SASA) demonstrated that this diaspora is very much emotionally bounded to its ethnic origin, even though they are greatly assimilated. They are frequently unable to clearly define their ethnic identity, and thus a great number of them use the term “our” to refer to their origin, language, culture, and community. Anyway, members of this diaspora consider themselves both as an integral part of Serbian people and loyal citizens of Argentina. Only a small number of immigrant descendants use Serbian language.

Some of homeland clubs, founded by first generations of emigrants in late 19th and early 20th century are still active and represent places where emigrants and their descendants gather. As much as modern life allows them nowadays, this diaspora make efforts to gather at homeland clubs to satisfy specific cultural needs. It is important to mention that Serbian Orthodox Eparchy of Buenos Aires also plays important role of these people, it's usually their connection with the spiritual and cultural heritage.

Notable people
Expatriates
 Milan Stojadinović, Serbian politician, emigrated to Argentina in the 1940s
By descent
 Marcos Milinkovic, volleyball player 
 Capitanich Popovich Jorge, Argentinian politician (Montenegrin) 
 Geraldine Zivic, actress 
 Miguel Avramovic, rugby player
 Paola Vukojicic, field hockey goalkeeper
 Marcelo Burzac, football player

Annotations
Argentinian Serbs (Аргентински Срби) or Serbs in Argentina (Срби у Аргентини)

See also
 Argentina–Serbia relations

References

External links 
 Inmigrantes Serbios en America Latina

Argentina
European Argentine
Immigration to Argentina
Serb diaspora